Adelina is the Italian variant of Adeline, meaning 'noble' or 'nobility'. Its other variants are Adtelina , Adela, Adelia, Della, Adalyn, Adalynn, Adelyn, Alene, Aline, Delia, Aada and Ada.

Notable people with the name include:

Mononym
 Adelina of Holland (c. 990 – c. 1045), Dutch noblewoman
 Saint Adelina (died 1125), French Benedictine nun
 Adelina, a character in Lorien Legacies
 Adelina of Naples, a character in Yesterday, Today and Tomorrow

Given name
 Adelina Abranches (1866–1945), Portuguese stage actress
 Adelina Adalis (1900–1969), Soviet poet, prose writer, and translator
 Adelina Akhmetova (born 1998), Kazakhstani hurdler
 Adelina Barrion (1951–2010), Filipino entomologist
 Adelina Beljajeva (born 2003), Estonian rhythmic gymnast 
 Adelina Boguș (born 1988) Romanian rower
 Adelina Budai-Ungureanu (born 2000), Romanian volleyball player
 Adelina Catalani (fl. 1818–1832), Franco-Italian soprano
 Adelina Chilica, Angolan politician
 Adelina Cojocariu (born 1988), Romanian rower
 Adelina Covián, Spanish painter
 Adelina Dematti de Alaye (1927–2016), Argentine human rights activist
 Adelina Domingues (1888–2002), American supercentenarian
 Adelina Munro Drysdale (1896-1942), Argentine socialite
 Adelina Engman (born 1994), Finnish footballer
 Adelina von Fürstenberg, Swiss art curator
 Adelina Galyavieva (born 1996), Russian-French ice dancer
 Adelina Garcia (born 1923), American singer
 Adelina García Casillas (c. 1920–1939), member of the Las Trece Rosas
 Adelina Gavrilă (born 1978), Romanian triple jumper
 Adelina Gonzalez (born 1964), Spanish sailor
 Adelina Gurrea (1896–1971), Filipino journalist
 Adelina Gutiérrez (1925-2015), Chilean scientist 
 Adelina Ibatullina (born 1999), Russian pentathlete 
 Adelina Ismajli (born 1979), Albanian-Kosovar singer
 Adelina Kondrátieva (1917–2012), Argentine-Russian translator
 Adelina de Lara (1872–1961), British pianist
 Adélina Lévêque (c. 1795 – after 1859), Empress Consort of Haiti
 Dóris Monteiro or Adelina Dóris Monteiro (born 1934), Brazilian singer
 Adelina Murio-Celli d'Elpeux (1844–1900), Polish opera singer, music teacher, and composer
 Adelina Nicholls, Mexican sociologist
 Adelina Otero-Warren (1881–1965), American suffragist
 Adelina Paschalis-Souvestre (1847–1925), Polish singer and music teacher
 Adelina Pastor (born 1993), Romanian sprinter
 Adelina Patti (1843–1919), Italian opera singer
 Adelina Razetdinova (born 2000), Russian Paralympic swimmer
 Adelina Santos Rodriguez (1920–2021), Filipina politician and civil leader
 Adelina Sotnikova (born 1996), Russian figure skater
 Adelina Stehle (1860–1945), Austrian opera singer
 Adelina Tattilo (1929–2007), Italian magazine editor
 Adelina Thaçi (born 1980), Albanian-Kosovar singer
 Adelina Lopes Vieira (1850–1922/1933), Brazilian poet, playwright, and writer
 Adelina Zagidullina (born 1993), Russian fencer
 Adelina Zandrino (1893–1994), Italian artist and illustrator
 Adelina Zendejas (1909–1993), Mexican teacher, journalist, and feminist
 Adelina Zinurova, Uzbek water polo player

Romanian feminine given names